Quasimitra structilis is a species of sea snail, a marine gastropod mollusk, in the family Mitridae, the miters or miter snails.

Description
The length of the shell attains 14 mm.

Distribution
This marine species occurs off the Austral Islands, French Polynesia.

References

 Herrmann M. & Salisbury R.A. (2013) Three new Mitridae (Gastropoda) from French Polynesia with a new record for Mitra cernohorskyi (Rehder & Wilson, 1975). Conchylia 44(1-2): 31-43.

External links
 Fedosov A., Puillandre N., Herrmann M., Kantor Yu., Oliverio M., Dgebuadze P., Modica M.V. & Bouchet P. (2018). The collapse of Mitra: molecular systematics and morphology of the Mitridae (Gastropoda: Neogastropoda). Zoological Journal of the Linnean Society. 183(2): 253-337

structilis
Gastropods described in 2013